Events from the year 1800 in Sweden

Incumbents
 Monarch – Gustav IV Adolf

Events

 14 August - Trollhätte Canal, later a part of the Göta Canal, is inaugurated.
 Linnéska institutet is inaugurated.

Births

 10 January – Lars Levi Læstadius, religious reformer (died 1861)
 1 October – Peter Wieselgren, founder of the Swedish temperance movement  (died 1877)
 Helena Eldrup, educator (died 1872)

Deaths

 21 May - Carl August Ehrensvärd, artist and architect  (born 1745)
 29 May - Charlotte Slottsberg, ballerina  (born 1760)
 Julie Eckerman, courtesan and spy  (born 1765)
  Hedvig Catharina De la Gardie, courtier  (born 1732)
 Helena Maria Ehrenstråhle, poet  (born 1760)
 Margareta Sofia Lagerqvist, actress and singer (born 1771)
 Eva Fundin, actress and dancer (born 1777)

References

External links

 
Years of the 18th century in Sweden